Witold Gieras (23 June 1897 – 2 April 1985) was a Polish footballer. He played in three matches for the Poland national football team from 1923 to 1925.

References

External links
 

1897 births
1985 deaths
Polish footballers
Poland international footballers
Place of birth missing
Association footballers not categorized by position